This is a list of Ice Road Truckers Season 6 episodes.

The focus of this season is split among three locations, listed in "Route and destinations" below.

Episodes

Returning drivers

Debogorski, Rowland, and Yemm continue driving in Canada for this season, moving cargo along the Dempster Highway (Debogorski) and Manitoba's winter roads (Rowland and Yemm). Jessee (seasons 3 and 4) returns to drive the Dalton along with three newcomers, and Hall appears in one episode to help move a modular building up from Fairbanks. Near the end of the season, Veilleux (season 4) is called in to help transport the last loads up to Prudhoe Bay. Molesky and Kromm are involved in training drivers new to driving on the Dalton Highway for Carlile Transportation. Additionally, both Molesky and Kromm independently monitor other drivers' standards and behavior, and advise Fairbanks Terminal Manager Lane Keator if there are issues like those that led to Redmon and "Porkchop" being fired.

New drivers
 Darrell Ward (1964–2016): Coming to Alaska from Montana, Ward has 31 years of highway trucking experience, including driving logging trucks in the Rocky Mountains, and drove the Dalton for Alaska West Express in 2009. This is his first (and only) year at Carlile, and he ends up coming second to Jack Jessee by one load. Darrell, easily one of IRT's most popular drivers ever, was killed in a plane crash at the age of 52 on August 28, 2016. Ward at the time was a business partner with Lisa Kelly. The plane was piloted by Mark Melotz and it crashed near Rock Creek, Montana.
 Austin Wheeler: Wheeler, 23, has been a Carlile employee for almost two years, transporting heavy loads in southern Alaska before transferring to the Fairbanks depot. While his season ended early towards the end due to engine power issues, he earned credit in saving Darrell when the latter was stranded in the middle of the season.
 Ronald "Porkchop" Mangum: Mangum, 35, is a South Carolina trucker with 14 years of experience. Like Ward, he started his first season on the Dalton; he is fired near the end of the season due to concerns over his driving performance.

Route and destinations
Dalton Highway: This is the final season for the Dalton on the show.
Dempster Highway: Connects the Northwest Territories to the rest of Canada's road network through the Yukon.
Manitoba ice roads

Final load counts
Alaska
Jessee – 29
Ward – 28
Wheeler – 23
Veilleux – 5 (not in the full season)

Canada
Debogorski – 25
Rowland – 14
Yemm – 6

References 

2012 American television seasons
Ice Road Truckers seasons